Revenge is the third album by The Flying Luttenbachers, released on August 20, 1996 through Skin Graft Records.

Track listing

Personnel 
The Flying Luttenbachers
Chuck Falzone – guitar
Bill Pisarri – bass guitar, violin, clarinet, cover art
Weasel Walter – drums, cover art
Production and additional personnel
The Flying Luttenbachers – production
Greg Gold – photography
Mike Hagler – mastering

References

External links 
 

1996 albums
The Flying Luttenbachers albums
Skin Graft Records albums